Sibthorpia europaea is a species of flowering plant known by the common name Cornish moneywort. It can be found as a disjunct distribution in Western Europe from the Azores, Portugal and Spain to south-western Ireland and south-western United Kingdom. It also occurs in Crete, Pelion, Greece and tropical Africa. It is a prostrate perennial plant that is found in moist habitats.

Taxonomy
The genus Sibthorpia is named after Dr Humphry Sibthorp who was the Sherardian Professor of Botany at the University of Oxford from 1747 to 1783.

Description
Sibthorpia europaea is a small prostrate plant forming mats of thread-like stems which root as they creep across the ground. The mid-green hairy leaves are kidney-shaped and deeply notched. The flowers are tiny and develop singly in the leaf axils. They have relatively long stalks and five pinkish corolla-lobes, and appear from June onwards.

Distribution and habitat
Sibthorpia europaea has a discontinuous distribution in Western Europe and tropical Africa. It is known from County Kerry in southwestern Ireland, South Wales, southwestern England, and East Sussex, Spain, Portugal, the Azores, Crete, Pelion (Greece) and tropical Africa. It may be that this unusual distribution represents remnants of a species that was more widespread in the Tertiary period. It typically inhabits moist, shady locations such as stream-banks, the sides of ditches, woodland, wet heathland, shady path verges, lawns and old walls and banks with a thin covering of soil. In Ireland it grows at altitudes up to  but populations seem to be dwindling as it faces competition from the more aggressive New Zealand willowherb.

References

External links

 

Plantaginaceae
Flora of Africa
Flora of Europe
Taxa named by Carl Linnaeus